Rocherpan Nature Reserve is a nature reserve on the West Coast of Western Cape, South Africa.

In 1839, Pierre Rocher dredged the mouth of the Papkuils River and used water drawn from the Auroraberg Mountains to make better pasture for his cattle behind the dunes. In the process, he unwittingly established ideal bird habitat. From March to June, however, the lake is dry. 183 species of birds (including 70 of waterfowl) can be found here, including, among others, the great white pelican (Pelecanus onocrotalus), the African oystercatcher (Haematopus moquini), and the greater flamingo. There is also a hatching ground for the Cape shoveler(Anas smithii) From June to September, whales frequent the coast. In the spring, the veld often features the Namaqualand bloom.

The lake was declared a nature reserve in 1966. Since 1988, the area  from the coast has been a marine reserve. In the park are hiking trails, two bird hides, and an untouched beach.

References 

 Die Burger, 23 July 2013

Nature reserves in South Africa
1966 establishments in South Africa